Mamaniri (Aymara mamani falcon, hawk, -ni a suffix to indicate ownership, "the one with the falcon (or hawk)", also spelled Mamanire) is a  mountain in the La Raya mountain range in the Andes of Peru. It is situated in the Puno Region, Melgar Province, Santa Rosa District. Mamaniri lies near the La Raya pass northwest of Khunurana and Puka Urqu.

References

Mountains of Puno Region
Mountains of Peru